Tomaszewo may refer to:

Tomaszewo, Aleksandrów County in Kuyavian-Pomeranian Voivodeship (north-central Poland)
Tomaszewo, Brodnica County in Kuyavian-Pomeranian Voivodeship (north-central Poland)
Tomaszewo, Lipno County in Kuyavian-Pomeranian Voivodeship (north-central Poland)
Tomaszewo, Mogilno County in Kuyavian-Pomeranian Voivodeship (north-central Poland)
Tomaszewo, Masovian Voivodeship (east-central Poland)
Tomaszewo, Konin County in Greater Poland Voivodeship (west-central Poland)
Tomaszewo, Piła County in Greater Poland Voivodeship (west-central Poland)
Tomaszewo, Słupca County in Greater Poland Voivodeship (west-central Poland)
Tomaszewo, Szamotuły County in Greater Poland Voivodeship (west-central Poland)
Tomaszewo, Kościerzyna County in Pomeranian Voivodeship (north Poland)
Tomaszewo, Starogard County in Pomeranian Voivodeship (north Poland)
Tomaszewo, Warmian-Masurian Voivodeship (north Poland)